Taranath Tantrik is a Bengali horror web series streaming on Bengali OTT platform hoichoi. Bibhutibhushan wrote two short stories about the character of necromancer and Hindu esoteric occult practitioner Taranath Tantrik. It is directed by Qaushiq Mukherjee who also known as Q.

Cast 
Jayant Kripalani
Koushik Roy
Satrajit Sarkar
Joyraj Bhattacharya
Sweta Chaudhuri
Uma Banerjee
Geetanjali Dang

Episodes

Season 1 (2019)
The series first started streaming on the OTT platform on 18 January 2019 with 10 episodes.

Episodes

References

External links

Indian web series
2019 web series debuts
Bengali-language web series
Hoichoi original programming